Michael David Larnach (born 9 November 1952) is a Scottish footballer, who played for East Stirlingshire, Clydebank, Newcastle United, Motherwell, Ayr United and Stenhousemuir.

References

External links

1952 births
Living people
Association football forwards
Scottish footballers
East Stirlingshire F.C. players
Clydebank F.C. (1965) players
Newcastle United F.C. players
Motherwell F.C. players
Ayr United F.C. players
Stenhousemuir F.C. players
Scottish Football League players
English Football League players
People from Caithness
Sportspeople from Highland (council area)